Ohio State Murders is a play written by Adrienne Kennedy. The play was first published on January 14, 1991.

Plot 
Ohio State Murders is a one act play that revolves around racism, misogyny, and young adulthood. The play focuses on the life of Suzanne Alexander, a college student at Ohio State University from 1949 to 1950. As she goes back to her alma mater as a renowned Black author to speak, Suzanne addresses the reasons why she uses "violent" images in her works. This query gives Suzanne the platform to fully speak about her trauma experienced as a black woman at Ohio State University and the murder of her daughters Cathi and Carol by her professor, and father of her children, Robert Hampshire.

Suzanne is faced with systemic racism through the education system, sexism by her professor and police, and internalized racism from her family members.

Characters 
 Suzanne Alexander — Writer and Ohio State University alumni
 Robert Hampshire — English professor at Ohio State University
 Iris Ann — Suzanne’s roommate at Ohio State
 David Alexander — Suzanne’s husband and former law student at Ohio State
 Val — Suzanne’s acquaintance
 Aunt Lou — Suzanne’s aunt who cares for her after the birth of her children
 Mrs. Tyler — A widow that provided lodging to Suzanne in Columbus
 Cathi & Carol — Suzanne’s baby twin daughters

Productions
The play was first performed January 14 – February 9, 1991 at Yale Repertory Theatre's Winterfest, starring Olivia Cole. It was produced by Lloyd Richards, and directed by Gerald Freeman. It then premiered at Cleveland's Great Lakes Theater Festival who commissioned it, and was produced Off Broadway in 2007 at Theatre for a New Audience after a Signature Theatre production that never officially opened.

In 2021, the play was announced to be second of a three-part live series that would be held at The Goodman Theatre in Chicago, Illinois.

It officially opened on Broadway in December 2022 as the first production in the restored James Earl Jones Theatre. The production, directed by Kenny Leon and starring Audra McDonald, marked the playwright's Broadway debut at the age of 91. On January 5, 2023, it was announced that the show would close on January 15.

Background 
Ohio State Murders is part of a series of plays by Adrienne Kennedy called "Alexander Plays". These plays are connected due to the recurring character, Suzanne Alexander.  

Kennedy was raised in Cleveland, Ohio. Her and her family were of the middle-class and both her parents were involved in fields that helped children academically. She started to write when she was a child, but didn't begin writing plays until she was an adult. By the time she started writing plays, she had already married her husband and was taking care of her first child. After marrying her husband, she left Cleveland and relocated to New York.

While her childhood was filled with much diversity, Adrienne Kennedy was introduced to systemic racism when she went to Ohio State University. There, she observed and took notice of the institution's discrimination against black people. By the time Kennedy was 34, her first story got published, Funnyhouse of a Negro. She was also a creative writing teacher at UC Davis and had other side interests, including writing musicals and writing for films.

The story of Ohio State Murders takes place in Ohio State University during the 1950s. A decade before the civil rights movement, that was a time when there were only 300 black students. The total population of the campus rounded towards 27,000 people. At the time, black people were restricted from other things within the university that prevented them from growing in terms of gaining educational fulfillment, including not being allowed to major in certain subjects or be part of certain social clubs. Kennedy attended Ohio State University in the late 1940s and used her real experience as well the experiences of other black people to tell her story. She drew inspiration from the stories told to her by her mother and by the news of what was happening to black people around her neighborhood.

References

External links
 

Broadway plays
1991 plays